This is a list of chapters for the manga series Initial D written by Shuichi Shigeno and serialized in Young Magazine. The first chapter appeared in the 1995 issue and the series ended in 2013, with seven hundred and nineteen chapters published as of 2013. The anime adaptation based on the manga is being produced by Studio Gallop and Pastel and aired on Fuji Television and Animax. The First Stage premiered on April 18, 1998, with 26 episodes aired. The Second Stage premiered on October 14, 1999, with 13 episodes aired. The Fourth Stage premiered on April 17, 2004, with 24 episodes aired. In addition, an animated movie (Third Stage) and four OVAs (Extra Stage with two episodes, "Battle Stage" and "Battle Stage 2") based on the manga have been produced.

Seven hundred and nineteen chapters have been collected into forty-eight tankōbon and published in Japan by Kodansha. The first tankōbon was released on November 6, 1995, and the forty-eight was released on November 6, 2013.

In North America, Initial D was licensed by Tokyopop, who have released thirty-three volumes. The first volume was released in May 2002, with the thirty-third released on January 13, 2009. On April 17, 2019, ComiXology and Kodansha Comics released volumes 1–38 digitally, marking the availability of volumes 34–38 in English for the first time. On July 20, 2019, ComiXology and Kodansha Comics released the remaining volumes 39–48 digitally. 


Volume list

Part 1:  Akina's Eight-Six

Part 2:  Project D

References

Initial D
Initial D